The Koda is a tributary on the right (north) side of the Angara, 13 km northeast of the city of Kodinsk, in the Kezhemsky District of Krasnoyarsk Krai, Russia.

The river gave the name to the town of Kodinsk.  It is claimed to derive from the Evenki word kada, meaning "cliff".  

A seasonal settlement of the same name was the headquarters for the construction of the Boguchany Dam across the Angara, starting 1975. With the filling of the reservoir in 2012, the lower 30 km of the Koda river valley were flooded and are now a branch of the dam's reservoir.

The region has yielded prehistoric remains.

References

Rivers of Krasnoyarsk Krai